The 2021 Melon Music Awards, organized by Kakao M and Melon, took place on December 4, 2021. This was the thirteenth ceremony in the show's history, and the second to be held without an audience in light of the COVID-19 pandemic. Hosted by comedian Lee Yong-jin and radio announcer Park Seon-young, the ceremony was broadcast online through KakaoTV, Melon, and 1theK's official YouTube channel. Artists who released music between November 11, 2020, and November 7, 2021, were eligible for and honored at the awards.

IU, BTS, and Aespa won the Daesangs for Artist of the Year and Album of the Year, Song of the Year, and Record of the Year respectively.

Judging criteria

Voting
Voting for Melon's Top 10 Artists category opened on the Melon Music website on November 8 and continued until November 22, 2021. Only artists who released music between November 11, 2020, and November 7, 2021, are eligible. The longlist of nominees was selected based on a chart performance score (60% downloads and 40% streams) for each artist combined with weekly Melon Popularity Award votes achieved during the eligibility period. Voting by Category awards, including nine categories: Top 10 Artists, Album of the Year, Song of the Year, Best New Artist, Best Male Solo, Best Female Solo, Best Male Group, Best Female Group, and Netizen Popularity Award.

Performances

Presenters

Winners and nominees 

Winners are listed first and highlighted in bold.

Other

Notes

References

External links
  (Melon)

Melon Music Awards ceremonies
2021 music awards
Annual events in South Korea